James Francis Moriarty (born 1953) is a United States diplomat and career foreign service officer with the rank of Minister-Counselor. 
From 2008 to 2011, he was the U.S. Ambassador to Bangladesh. Since 2016, he has been the Chairman of the American Institute in Taiwan.

Career
Prior to this assignment, Mr. Moriarty served as U.S. Ambassador to Nepal between 2004 and 2007. Before moving to Nepal, Ambassador Moriarty served in 2002–2004 as Special Assistant to the President of the United States of America and Senior Director at the National Security Council. 
He was responsible for advising on and coordinating U.S. policy on East Asia, South Asia, and the Pacific region. 
Ambassador Moriarty also worked in the White House in 2001–2002 as National Security Council Director for China Affairs.

In 1998–2001, Ambassador Moriarty served as Minister-Counselor for Political Affairs at the U.S. Embassy in Beijing. In 1994–1998, he led the General Affairs (Political) Section at the American Institute in Taiwan.

Ambassador Moriarty shaped the U.S. response to Chinese missile tests in the Taiwan Strait, the U.S. bombing of the Chinese embassy in Belgrade, and the ramming of a U.S. EP-3 plane off China's Hainan Island.

In these jobs and at the National Security Council, Ambassador Moriarty helped lay the groundwork for U.S.-China policy for the 21st century.

As Deputy Director of the State Department's Office of United Nations (UN) Political Affairs in 1991–93, Ambassador Moriarty coordinated U.S. policy on UN Security Council issues. He received the American Foreign Service Association’s Rivkin Award for his principled approach to the breakup of Yugoslavia.

Ambassador Moriarty was Diplomat-in-Resident at the East-West Center in Honolulu, Hawaii in 1993–94. 
Earlier assignments in his career included postings at the U.S. Embassies in Pakistan, Swaziland, and Morocco, additional tours in Beijing and Taipei, and work on African issues at the U.S. Department of State. 
He joined the Foreign Service in 1975.

Life
Ambassador Moriarty earned his Bachelor of Arts in history, summa cum laude, from Dartmouth College. He speaks Chinese, Nepali, Urdu, French and Bangla. 
Ambassador Moriarty is married to Lauren Moriarty, also a career diplomat, and is father to a son and a daughter.

Among his numerous awards are individual State Department Superior Honor Awards for his work in China (2000) and on Yugoslavia (1993) and two Group Superior Honor Awards. 
For his reporting and analysis in Pakistan, Ambassador Moriarty won the Director General's 1987 Award as the State Department's best reporting officer. 
He received a Presidential Pay Award in 2005 and, on numerous occasions, State Department Performance Pay.

References

External links

 Biography of James F. Moriarty at the US State Department
 Presidential Nomination: James Francis Moriarty

1953 births
Living people
Ambassadors of the United States to Nepal
Ambassadors of the United States to Bangladesh
Dartmouth College alumni
Chairs of the American Institute in Taiwan
United States Foreign Service personnel
21st-century American diplomats